Charles Hector Fitzroy Maclean, Baron Maclean,  (5 May 1916 – 8 February 1990) was Lord Chamberlain to Elizabeth II of the United Kingdom from 1971 to 1984. He became the 27th Clan Chief of Clan Maclean of Duart in 1936 at the death of his grandfather.

Biography
Maclean was born on 5 May 1916 to Major Hector Fitzroy Maclean (1873–1932) and Winifred Joan Wilding (c1875-1941), daughter of J. H. Wilding. He succeeded as the 27th Chief of Clan Maclean of Duart in 1936 at the death of his grandfather, Sir Fitzroy Maclean, 10th Baronet. He married (Joan) Elizabeth Mann (1923–2021), granddaughter of Sir Edward Mann, 1st Baronet, of Thelveton Hall in 1941. They had two children and eight grandchildren:
The Hon. Lachlan Hector Charles Maclean (b. 1942); married with issue, including the heir to the baronetcy 
The Hon. Janet Elizabeth Maclean (b. 1944); married with issue

He saw active service in World War II while serving in the 3rd Battalion Scots Guards. He fought in France, Belgium, the Netherlands and Germany. After the war ended he became a sheep and cattle farmer in Scotland. He was Lord Lieutenant of Argyllshire from 1954 to 1975

The Boy Scouts Association appointed Maclean as its Chief Scout of the United Kingdom from 1959 to 1971 and Commonwealth from 1959 to August 1975. He oversaw the formation of his Advance Party and its The Chief Scout's Advance Party Report which resulted in sweeping changes to the Boy Scouts Association and disaffection and schisms but failed to arrest enrolment losses and shifted the balance of enrolments to younger age children. The World Organization of the Scout Movement’s committee awarded him its only distinction, the Bronze Wolf in 1967, for exceptional services to world Scouting.

He was created a life peer as Baron Maclean, of Duart and Morven in the County of Argyll in 1971. His first ceremonial assignment as Lord Chamberlain was the 1972 funeral of the Duke of Windsor. He was Lord High Commissioner to the General Assembly of the Church of Scotland in 1984 and 1985.

He died on 8 February 1990 at Hampton Court Palace.

Honours
 Brigadier, Queen's Body Guard for Scotland (Royal Company of Archers)
 Knight Commander, Order of the British Empire (1967)
 Knight, Order of the Thistle (1969)
 Lord Chamberlain to Elizabeth II of the United Kingdom (1971)
 Knight of the Grand Cross, Royal Victorian Order (1971)
 Created a Life Peer as Baron Maclean, of Duart and Morvern in the County of Argyll (1971)
 Lord in Waiting upon retiring as Lord Chamberlain (1984)
 Royal Victorian Chain (1984)
 Chief Steward of Hampton Court Palace (1985)

Ancestors

References

1916 births
1990 deaths
British Army personnel of World War II
Recipients of the Bronze Wolf Award
Charles Hector
Crossbench life peers
Knights Commander of the Order of the British Empire
Knights of the Thistle
Knights Grand Cross of the Royal Victorian Order
Lord-Lieutenants of Argyllshire
Lord-Lieutenants of Argyll and Bute
Maclean, Charles Maclean of Duart, Baron
People educated at Canford School
People from the Isle of Mull
Scots Guards officers
Chief Scouts (The Scout Association)
Lords High Commissioner to the General Assembly of the Church of Scotland
Members of the Royal Company of Archers
Maclean, Charles, 7th Lord
20th-century Scottish businesspeople
Life peers created by Elizabeth II